Francis-Pierre Coché, born (August 5, 1924 - May 4, 2010), is a French women's football coach. Coché coached the France women's national football team for 35 games, with 13 wins, 7 draws and 15 losses, and notably managed the team at the 1979 European Competition for Women's Football.

In 2022,  Francis-Pierre Coché was accused of sexual harassment during his time as coach of the France national team which was uncovered by French Romain Molina.

References

1924 births
2010 deaths
French football managers
Women's association football managers
France women's national football team managers